Group B of the 1999 Fed Cup Americas Zone Group I was one of two pools in the Americas Zone Group I of the 1999 Fed Cup. Five teams competed in a round robin competition, with the top team advancing to the Group I play-off, the winner of which would advance to World Group II Play-offs, and the bottom team being relegated down to 2000 Group II.

Venezuela vs. Puerto Rico

Brazil vs. Chile

Canada vs. Chile

Brazil vs. Puerto Rico

Venezuela vs. Canada

Chile vs. Puerto Rico

Venezuela vs. Brazil

Canada vs. Puerto Rico

Venezuela vs. Chile

Canada vs. Brazil

  failed to win any ties in the pool, and thus was relegated to Group II in 2000, where they placed fourth overall.

See also
Fed Cup structure

References

External links
 Fed Cup website

1999 Fed Cup Americas Zone